Pratson may refer to:

 Frederick Pratson (1935-1989), a historian and writer of travel guides
 Lincoln Pratson, an American geologist currently the Truman and Nellie Semans/Alex Brown & Sons Professor of Earth and Ocean Sciences at Duke University